Witold Wojciech Czarnecki (born 12 April 1953 in Murowana Goślina) is a Polish politician. He was elected to the Sejm on 25 September 2005, getting 12,826 votes in 36 Kalisz district as a candidate from the Law and Justice list.

See also
Members of Polish Sejm 2005-2007

External links
Witold Czarnecki - parliamentary page - includes declarations of interest, voting record, and transcripts of speeches.

1953 births
Living people
People from Poznań County
Law and Justice politicians
Members of the Polish Sejm 2005–2007
Members of the Polish Sejm 2007–2011
Members of the Polish Sejm 2011–2015
Members of the Polish Sejm 2015–2019
Members of the Polish Sejm 2019–2023
Poznań University of Technology alumni